André Dumont may refer to:
 André Dumont (geologist)
 André Dumont (politician)
 André Dumont (cyclist)